Ernst Schowengerdt House is a historic home located at Warrenton, Warren County, Missouri.  The original section was built in 1866, as a two-story, five bay brick dwelling with two Classical Revival style porches.  It was extensively remodeled in the Queen Anne style in 1892–1893.  The remodeling added a three-story round tower emerging halfway through the main block of the house. The building houses the Warren County Historical Society.

It was listed on the National Register of Historic Places in 1980.

References

History museums in Missouri
Houses on the National Register of Historic Places in Missouri
Neoclassical architecture in Missouri
Queen Anne architecture in Missouri
Houses completed in 1866
Buildings and structures in Warren County, Missouri
National Register of Historic Places in Warren County, Missouri